Alto da Boa Vista is a neighborhood in the North Zone of Rio de Janeiro, Brazil.

Geography

Climate

References

Neighbourhoods in Rio de Janeiro (city)